Art of the Devil ( or Khon len khong) is a 2004 Thai horror film directed by Tanit Jitnukul. It has two titular sequels, Art of the Devil 2 (2005) and Art of the Devil 3 (2008), but these films feature a different story with new characters.

Plot
Art of the Devil tells the story of Boom (Supaksorn Chaimongkol), a young Thai girl who meets a married man named Prathan (Tin Settachoke) at a country club. The two soon begin an affair, and Boom finds herself pregnant. When she breaks the news to Prathan, he appears to settle for giving her a sum of money in exchange for her silence, reassuring her that he will not leave her. However, he then wakes her up in the middle of the night, informing her that for that large an amount of money, he had the right to share her with his friends. While Prathan wields a video camera, his friends chase a terrified and screaming Boom out of the room and onto the beach, where they apparently gang-rape her.

After getting an ultrasound at the hospital (revealing that her child has some abnormalities), Boom shows up at the restaurant where Prathan's daughter (of his second marriage) is celebrating her birthday and informs him that the sum of money he had given her was not enough. He pulls her outside and hits her, tossing a wad of cash at her and warning her not to come near his family again.

Furious, Boom enlists the aid of a black magic user to exact revenge on her ex-lover and his entire family, notably causing the second eldest son to shoot his girlfriend and his little sister before turning the gun on himself.

After their deaths, Boom visits a temple and finds that if she donates coffins for the spirits, they will not bother her. She makes some offerings. While leaving the temple, she sees the ghosts of her victims in the back of a car and steps off of the sidewalk to get a better look, whereupon she is hit by a car. The resulting accident causes her to lose her baby.

Prathan's first wife inherits his fortune. She and her four children move into the house. Boom again uses black magic to kill this new family off. However, her motive this time is not for revenge, but in order to claim the inheritance. A young newspaper reporter becomes suspicious, so Boom arranges for his death, as well. Throughout this, the ghost of Boom's dead daughter is seen around the house.

The story ends with only the youngest son and eldest daughter surviving the massacre. Boom voluntarily falls to her death from the roof of the hospital after seeing her daughter's ghost.

Cast
 Arisa Wills as Nan
 Supakson Chaimongkol as Boom
 Krongthong Rachatawan as Kamala
 Tin Settachoke as Prathan
 Somchai Satuthum as Danai
 Isara Ochakul as Ruj
 Nirut Sutchart as Neng
 Krittayod Thimnate as Bon

Reception
Art of the Devil premiered on June 17, 2004, and was the No. 4 film its opening weekend, behind Around the World in 80 Days, Harry Potter and the Prisoner of Azkaban, and The Punisher. It stayed in the No. 4 spot for two more weeks before moving to No. 5 in its fourth week at the box office.

See also
 List of ghost films

References

External links
 

2004 films
2004 horror films
Five Star Production films
Thai-language films
Thai horror films
Thai ghost films
Films about witchcraft
Thai supernatural horror films